Lepechinia rossii is a rare species of flowering plant in the mint family known by the common name Ross' pitcher sage.

It is endemic to the Transverse Ranges of California on the north edge of the Greater Los Angeles Area. This species was first described to science only in 2006.

Distribution
The plant is known from four occurrences, two in the Topatopa Mountains of Ventura County near Fillmore, and two in the Sierra Pelona Mountains east of Castaic Lake in Los Angeles County.

Its habitat is chaparral of the California chaparral and woodlands ecoregion.

Description
Lepechinia rossii  is a perennial herb or shrub with hairy, glandular herbage. The leaves have toothed or serrated oval blades measuring up to 13 centimeters long.

The inflorescence is an open raceme of flowers with large, leaflike bracts at the base. The flowers have bell-shaped calyces of reddish or purple-tinged sepals and bell-shaped white or purplish corollas.

Conservation
Threats to this rare species include off-road vehicles, power line maintenance activity, petroleum drilling and exploration, introduced plant species such as brome grasses, and alterations in the fire regime in the southern California chaparral where it grows.

References

External links
Jepson Manual Treatment: Lepechinia rossii
California Native Plant Society Rare Plant Profile of Lepechinia rossii

rossii
Endemic flora of California
Natural history of the California chaparral and woodlands
Natural history of the Transverse Ranges
Natural history of Los Angeles County, California
Natural history of Ventura County, California
Sierra Pelona Ridge
Topatopa Mountains
Plants described in 2006
Critically endangered flora of California